Agrahara is a village in the Sandur taluk of Ballari district in Karnataka, India.

See also
 Districts of Karnataka

References

Villages in Bellary district